John (Jack) Peters (born 1951) is an American International Master of chess. He currently teaches at University of Southern California, and is known for his weekly Los Angeles Times chess column which ran from September 19, 1982, to November 28, 2010.

References

External links

Jack Peters rating card at United States Chess Federation
Faculty Profile at University of Southern California
The Chess Games of John A. Peters

1951 births
Living people
American chess players
American chess writers
American male non-fiction writers
Chess International Masters
American people of Dutch descent